Protocadherin-8 is a protein that in humans is encoded by the PCDH8 gene.

This gene belongs to the protocadherin gene family, a subfamily of the cadherin superfamily. The gene encodes an integral membrane protein that is thought to function in cell adhesion in a CNS-specific manner. Unlike classical cadherins, which are generally encoded by 15-17 exons, this gene includes only 3 exons. Notable is the large first exon encoding the extracellular region, including 6 cadherin domains and a transmembrane region. Alternative splicing yields isoforms with unique cytoplasmic tails.

References

Further reading